Dimorphoceratidae is one of two families included in the Dimorphoceratoidea, a superfamily of ammonoid cephalopods belonging to the Goniatitida that lived during the Late Paleozoic. They are dimorphocerataceans in which the external lateral lobes and prongs of the ventral lobe are bifid. The shells are strongly involute, subdiscoidal to lenticular.

References

Miller, A.K. et al. Paleozoic Ammonoidea. Treatise on Invertebrate Paleontology. Geological Society of America and University of Kansas Press.
Dimorphoceratidae in GONIAT Online 5/30/12
 The Paleobiology Database 10/01/07

 
Goniatitida families
Dimorphocerataceae